Pa Mamadou Gai (born 10 October 1977) is a former Gambian sprinter who competed in the men's 100m competition at the 1996 Summer Olympics. He recorded a 10.72, not enough to qualify for the next round past the heats. His personal best is 10.72, set during that race. In 1996 he was also a part of the Gambian 4 × 100 m team, which finished 7th in its heat with a score of 41.80. He also competed in the 100m at the 2000 Summer Olympics, recording an 11.03

References

1977 births
Living people
Gambian male sprinters
Athletes (track and field) at the 1996 Summer Olympics
Athletes (track and field) at the 2000 Summer Olympics
Olympic athletes of the Gambia